Seter or Sæter may refer to:

Farming
Seter or Sæter, a Scandinavian mountain pasture used in the practice of transhumance

People
Arne Sæter (1913–1973), a Norwegian politician for the Christian Democratic Party
Einar Sæter (1917–2010), a Norwegian triple jumper, resistance member, newspaper editor and writer
Ingebrigt Haldorsen Sæter (1800–1875), a Norwegian politician and farmer 
John Hou Sæter (born 1998), a Norwegian footballer who plays in midfield for Stabæk
Lars Sæter (1895–1988), a Norwegian politician for the Christian Democratic Party
Mordecai Seter (1916–1994), a Russian-born Israeli composer
Olaf Sæter (1872–1945), a Norwegian rifle shooter who competed in the early 20th century
Olav Jørgen Sæter (1884–1951), a Norwegian schoolteacher, newspaper editor and politician

Places
Seter, Aukra, a village in the municipality of Aukra in Møre og Romsdal county, Norway
Seter, Indre Fosen, a village in the municipality in Indre Fosen in Trøndelag county, Norway
Seter, Osen, a village in the municipality in Osen in Trøndelag county, Norway
Sæter (station), a railway station in Oslo, Norway
Sæter Chapel, an old chapel in Oslo, Norway

See also
Säter Municipality